Tyler Sirois is a Republican member of the Florida Legislature representing the state's 51st House District, which includes part of Brevard County on Florida's Space Coast.

Florida House of Representatives
Sirois defeated Henry Parrish in the August 28, 2018 Republican primary, winning 61.5% of the vote. In the November 6, 2018 general election, Sirois won 57.73% of the vote, defeating Democrat Mike Blake.

Sirois is a co-chairman of the Florida Legislature's Space Caucus, a group of members supporting the expansion of Florida's commercial aerospace industry.

References

Republican Party members of the Florida House of Representatives
Living people
21st-century American politicians
Florida State University alumni
People from Cape Canaveral, Florida
1984 births